Kharba is a village in Chanchal I CD Block in Chanchal subdivision of Malda district in the Indian state of West Bengal. The town is located on the western banks of the Mahananda River.

Geography

Location

Kharba is a village panchayat under Chanchal I intermediate panchayat in Malda district.:

Area overview
The area shown in the adjacent map covers two physiographic regions – the Barind in the east and the tal in the west. The eastern part is comparatively high (up to 40 metres above mean sea level at places) and uneven. The soils of the eastern region are “hard salty clays of a reddish hue and the ground is baked hard as iron.” It lies to the east of the Mahananda River. The area lying to the west of the Mahananda River, the tal, is a flat low land and “is strewn with innumerable marshes, bils and oxbow lakes.” The tal area is prone to flooding by local rivers. The total area is overwhelmingly rural. There are two important historical/ archaeological sites in the area – Pandua and Jagjivanpur.

Note: The map alongside presents some of the notable locations in the area. All places marked in the map are linked in the larger full screen map.

Demographics
As per the 2011 Census of India, Kharba had a total population of 3,744, of which 1,914 (51%) were males and 1,830 (49%) were females. Population below 6 years was 435. The total number of literates in Kharb was 2,835 (72.08% of the population over 6 years).

Healthcare
Chanchal subdivisional hospital at Chanchal (with 100 beds) is a major medical facility. There are primary health centres in Chanchal I CD Block at Kharba (with 10 beds) and Singla (Nadishik PHC) (with 10 beds).

See also
 Kharba (Vidhan Sabha constituency)

References

Villages in Malda district